Airartuuq Island is one of several uninhabited Canadian arctic islands in Kivalliq Region, Nunavut, Canada. It is located within western Hudson Bay,  from the abandoned trading post of Tavani.

Other islands in the vicinity include Bibby Island, Flattop Island, Imiligaarjuk Island, Imilijjuaq Island, Ivuniraarjuq Island, and Walrus Island.

References

Uninhabited islands of Kivalliq Region
Islands of Hudson Bay